Albert Ernest Glandaz (5 January 1870 – 22 March 1943) was a French sailor who represented his country at the 1900 Summer Olympics in Meulan, France. Albert Glandaz as helmsman, took the 13th place in first race of the 0.5 to 1 ton and did not finished in the second race. He did this with the boat Colette.

Further reading

References

External links

French male sailors (sport)
Sailors at the 1900 Summer Olympics – .5 to 1 ton
Olympic sailors of France
1870 births
1943 deaths
Sportspeople from Paris